Hantak is a surname. Notable people with the surname include:

Andrej Hanták (born 1985), Slovak footballer
Dick Hantak (born 1938), American football official
Ted Hantak (born 1962), American soccer player